Diuris alba, commonly called the white donkey orchid, is a species of orchid which is endemic to eastern Australia. It has up to three leaves, and a flowering stem with up to seven white flowers with purplish markings.

Description
Flowering occurs from August to November.

Taxonomy and naming
Diuris alba was first formally described in 1810 by Robert Brown and the description was published in Prodromus florae Novae Hollandiae. The specific epithet (alba) is a Latin word meaning "white".

Distribution and habitat
The white donkey orchid occurs on the coast and nearby ranges of New South Wales and Queensland north from the Central Coast. It grows with grasses in forest.

References

alba
Flora of New South Wales
Endemic orchids of Australia
Plants described in 1810